Biliary diseases include gallbladder disease and biliary tract diseases. In 2013 they resulted in 106,000 deaths up from 81,000 deaths in 1990.


Types
 malignant neoplasm of the gallbladder
 malignant neoplasm of other parts of biliary tract
 extrahepatic bile duct
 ampulla of Vater
 cholelithiasis
 cholecystitis
 others (excluding postcholecystectomy syndrome), but including
 other obstructions of the gallbladder (like strictures)
 hydrops, perforation, fistula
 cholesterolosis
 biliary dyskinesia
 K83: other diseases of the biliary tract:
 cholangitis (including ascending cholangitis and primary sclerosing cholangitis)
 obstruction, perforation, fistula of biliary tract
 spasm of sphincter of Oddi
 biliary cyst
 biliary atresia

References

Gallbladder disorders
Biliary tract disorders